Cape Town Spurs F.C. (formerly known as Ajax Cape Town) is a South African professional football club based in Parow in the city of Cape Town that plays in the National First Division. Dutch Eredivisie club AFC Ajax was their parent club and majority shareholder after a merger of both Cape Town Spurs and Seven Stars in January 1999 until selling its shares in September 2020.

History 

Cape Town Spurs were formed on 11 January 1970, competing in the National Professional Soccer League from 1971 until 1984, and the National Soccer League from 1985 to 1996, winning the championship in the final season, before the establishment of the South African Premier Division that same year. The club also won league  and the Cup  in 1995, then known as the Bob Save Super Bowl.

In 1999 Ajax Cape Town was formed via the amalgamation of two Cape Town-based teams, Seven Stars and Cape Town Spurs, as AFC Ajax expanded their worldwide talent-feeder network to South Africa, with the club adopting the club crest of the Amsterdam-based club. Ajax Cape Town was originally founded by John Comitis and Rob Moore in 1999. John Comitis, the honouree life chairman of Ajax Cape Town, later sold his shares in the club after 14 years at the helm and is now the chairmen of his new football team, Cape Town City Football Club.

Ajax, nicknamed Urban Warriors, played their first official game against Kaizer Chiefs in the Iwisa Charity Spectacular on 17 July 1999. Ajax caused an upset when they beat Chiefs 1–0 with Sam Pam, the Ajax Cape Town captain, scoring the winning goal.

Former South Africa national team coach Gordon Igesund, the country's most successful club coach, who won league titles with Manning Rangers, Orlando Pirates, Santos and Sundowns, coached the club from 2002 until 2006.

Since coming into existence, Ajax has never won the league title with their highest finish being runners-up in 2003–04, 2007–08 and 2010–11. Ajax managed to win the Rothmans Cup in 2000, the Nedbank Cup in 2007, the Telkom Knockout in 2008 and most recently the MTN8 in 2015.

In January 2007 Ajax CT managed to beat AFC Ajax 3–1 in a friendly game held in Cape Town. The next friendly, played in Amsterdam, ended in a 3–2 win for AFC Ajax in July 2009.

Over the years several Ajax CT players have made the step to the mother club, among them Steven Pienaar in 2002, Daylon Claasen in 2009, Eyong Enoh in 2008 and Thulani Serero in 2011.

In July 2013, it was announced that the Comitis brothers, longtime partners and shareholders with the Efstathiou brothers, had sold their Cape Town Stars shares, (19.6 % of Ajax Cape Town), to the Efstathiou family. Ari Efstathiou was announced as the new chairman, and Muhsin Ertuğral was reinstated as manager of the club, following an interim managerial period after originally being hired as the club's new technical director.

In September 2015, Ajax won the 2015 MTN8 tournament edging Kaizer Chiefs 1–0 in the final.

Ajax CT were relegated to the National First Division after finishing bottom in the 2017–18 season due to points been deducted.
Ajax CT were deducted points for apparently playing Thendai Ndoro, who, according to the Premier Soccer League was an illegible player. Ajax CT had previously been given the green light by the league and had officially registered the player with them as they were in possession of his player card. The team, therefore, would have not been relegated, had the points unfairly not been deducted, and had the league not overturned their original decision that Ndoro was eligible to play. 

Ajax CT finished in 4th place, outside of the playoff positions, in the 2018–19 National First Division, and again failed to achieve promotion the following season after losing in the playoffs to Black Leopards. Shortly thereafter, Ajax Amsterdam sold their 51% share in Ajax Cape Town.

In 2020, Ajax CT ended their association with Dutch club AFC Ajax, with Cape Town Stars acquiring full control of the club, and they subsequently renamed it Cape Town Spurs.

Youth programme 

Since the inception of the club, Ajax Cape Town have imported the AFC Ajax philosophy and effective youth development schemes in the Western Cape. The majority of the senior squad players have come up from the club's own youth ranks, such as the likes of Nazeer Allie, Granwald Scott and Thulani Hlatshwayo, while others such as Steven Pienaar and Thulani Serero have moved on to some of the top clubs in Europe.

With the introduction of the Ajax Cape Town Community Scheme in conjunction with the South African Police Services, Ajax CT also provides football opportunities to young people within the greater Cape Town area regardless of race, gender, social status or disability, facilitated through structured programs in a safe and fun learning environment.

Since then the Ajax Cape Town Community Scheme has been implemented in more than 120 schools across the Western Cape as far as the Cape Winelands, reaching more than 8,000 children.

Stadium 
In the beginning Ajax CT played their home games at Athlone Stadium and Newlands Stadium. The latter is a 51,900 capacity venue, which was first built in 1888, and was also host to the 1995 Rugby World Cup opening match. Essentially being a rugby stadium, it was a home they shared with clubs Santos and Vasco da Gama, as well as rugby teams Stormers and Western Province. Athlone Stadium was home to the Santos and has a capacity of 30,000. The stadium located in Athlone, Cape Town was also host to some of Ajax CT early home matches as well.

Moving to the Green Point Stadium, an 18,000 seat multi-purpose stadium in the Green Point area of Cape Town. The stadium was eventually demolished in 2007 to make way for the new Cape Town Stadium for the 2010 FIFA World Cup.
Construction of the new stadium was completed in 2009, and the Urban Warriors have played their home games at the Cape Town Stadium since the beginning of the 2010–11 Premier Soccer League season to an improved capacity of 55,000. On 3 August 2011 a contract extension of three years was negotiated with the stadium, which will see Ajax CT playing their home games there until 2014.

The first match played at the new stadium was a Cape Town derby between Ajax CT and Santos on 23 January 2010 as part of the official inauguration of the stadium.

Ajax Cape Town trains at their home base located in Parow. . It serves as the training grounds for the senior squad, as well as for the Ajax Cape Town Youth Development Academy. It has hosted a number of foreign clubs among them German Bundesliga club VfB Stuttgart during their midseason camp in 2014 as well as Viking FK from Norway.

Shirt sponsor & kit manufacturer 
 Shirt sponsor: Huawei
 Kit manufacturer: Adidas

Honours

National titles 
National Soccer League (1985 to 1996)
Winners: 1995

Cup competitions 
MTN 8 (Top 8 Tournament)
Winners: 20151

 Telkom Knockout (League Cup)
Winners: 20001, 20081

 Nedbank Cup (FA Cup)
Winners: 1995, 20071

Preseason 
 Mangaung Cup
Winners: 20071, 20081

1. Trophies won as Ajax Cape Town F.C. from 11 January 1999 to 28 September 2020.

Performance in CAF competitions

Continental appearances 
 CAF Champions League: 2 appearances
2005 – Group stage (Top 8)
2009 – First Round

 CAF Confederation Cup: 1 appearance
2008 – First Round of 16

Continental results 

 (1) CCP = CAF Co-efficiency points. Total number of points for CAF Coefficient: 17.0

Club records 
 Most starts:  Brett Evans 311
 Most goals:  Nathan Paulse 56
 Most capped player:  Edelbert Dinha
 Most starts in a season:  Edelbert Dinha 41 (2000–01)
 Most goals in a season:  Mabhuti Khenyeza 23 (2008–09)
 Record Victory: 5–1 vs Moroka Swallows (19 February 2006, PSL); vs  Mount Cameroon (26 April 2008, CAF Confederation Cup)
 Record defeat: 0–6 v Orlando Pirates (22 September 2004, PSL); vs Golden Arrows (24 October 2009, MTN 8)

Premier Soccer League record

Players

On loan

Foreigners 
In the South African PSL, only five non-South African nationals can be registered. Foreign players who have acquired permanent residency can be registered as locals.

  Kennedy Amutenya
  Igor Balotelli
  Jairo
  Moisés Amor
  Chico

Retired numbers 
21 –  Cecil Lolo (Defender, 2009–15). Number retired on 30 October 2015 at Lolo's memorial service.

Club officials/Technical team 
 Honorary Life Chairman: N/A
 Chief Executive Officer:  Alexi Efstathiou
 Chairman & Director : Ari Efstathiou
 Chief Operating Officer: Coenrad Fourie
 General Manager of Football:  Shooz Mekuto
 Head coach:  Shaun Bartlett
 Assistant coach:  Nassief Morris
 Goalkeeper coach:  Calvin Marlin
 Multichoice Diski Challenge team coach:  N/A
 ABC Motsepe team coach:  Duncan Crowie
 Head of scouting:  TBA

Notable former players

Managers 
  Leo van Veen (1999–00)
  Henk Bodewes (2000)
  Steve Haupt (interim) (2000–01)
  Rob McDonald (2001–02)
  Gordon Igesund (2002–06)
  Muhsin Ertuğral (2006–07)
  Craig Rosslee (2007–09)
  Muhsin Ertuğral and  Jan Pruijn (interim) (2009)
  Foppe De Haan (2009–11)
  Maarten Stekelenburg (2011–12)
  Wilfred Mugeyi and  Jan Pruijn (interim) (2012)
  Jan Versleijen and  Muhsin Ertuğral (int.) (2013)
  Muhsin Ertuğral (2013–14)
  Ian Taylor (interim) (2014)
  Roger De Sá (2014–2016)
  Stanley Menzo (2016–2017)
  Muhsin Ertuğral (2017–2018)
  Andries Ulderink (2018–20)
  Vladislav Herić (2020–present)

References

External links 
 
 Premier Soccer League
 PSL Club Info
 South African Football Association
 Confederation of African Football

 
Premier Soccer League clubs
Soccer clubs in Cape Town
1970 establishments in South Africa